James Lysander Berkey (April 10, 1930 – July 3, 1982) was an American set decorator. He was nominated for an Academy Award in the category Best Art Direction for the film Heaven's Gate.

Selected filmography

References

External links

1930 births
1982 deaths
American set decorators